New Paris is a village in Preble County, Ohio,  United States. The population was 1,629 at the 2010 census. It is part of the Dayton Metropolitan Statistical Area.

History 
New Paris was platted in 1817, and named after Paris, Kentucky, the former home of a share of the first settlers.  A post office called New Paris has been in operation since 1820.

Geography
New Paris is located at  (39.855952, -84.794170).

The village is at the intersection of State  Routes 121 and 320, north of Interstate 70.

New Paris is just east of the Indiana state line.

The village is heavily dominated by cornfields, a staple of this area of Ohio.

Demographics

2010 census
As of the census of 2010, there were 1,629 people, 715 households, and 431 families living in the village. The racial makeup of the village was 97.7% White, 0.1% African American, 0.6% Native American, 0.1% Asian, 0.1% Pacific Islander, 0.1% from other races, and 1.3% from two or more races. Hispanic or Latino of any race were 0.4% of the population.

There were 715 households, of which 31.9% had children under the age of 18 living with them, 37.8% were married couples living together, 16.2% had a female householder with no husband present, 6.3% had a male householder with no wife present, and 39.7% were non-families. 34.3% of all households were made up of individuals, and 14.4% had someone living alone who was 65 years of age or older. The average household size was 2.28 and the average family size was 2.87.

The median age in the village was 36.7 years. 25.6% of residents were under the age of 18; 8.4% were between the ages of 18 and 24; 25.6% were from 25 to 44; 25.8% were from 45 to 64; and 14.7% were 65 years of age or older. The gender makeup of the village was 46.8% male and 53.2% female.

2000 census
As of the census of 2000, there were 1,623 people, 692 households, and 446 families living in the village. The population density was 2,272.1 people per square mile (882.6/km2). There were 744 housing units at an average density of 1,041.6 per square mile (404.6/km2). The racial makeup of the village was 99.01% White, 0.31% African American, 0.12% Asian, and 0.55% from two or more races. Hispanic or Latino of any race were 0.12% of the population.

There were 692 households, out of which 30.9% had children under the age of 18 living with them, 48.3% were married couples living together, 11.6% had a female householder with no husband present, and 35.5% were non-families. 30.9% of all households were made up of individuals, and 11.1% had someone living alone who was 65 years of age or older. The average household size was 2.35 and the average family size was 2.91.

In the village, the population was spread out, with 24.2% under the age of 18, 10.4% from 18 to 24, 29.3% from 25 to 44, 20.8% from 45 to 64, and 15.3% who were 65 years of age or older. The median age was 37 years. For every 100 females there were 93.9 males. For every 100 females age 18 and over, there were 91.6 males.

The median income for a household in the village was $31,726, and the median income for a family was $36,402. Males had a median income of $27,870 versus $21,731 for females. The per capita income for the village was $14,422. About 8.2% of families and 10.1% of the population were below the poverty line, including 18.8% of those under age 18 and 4.0% of those age 65 or over.

Education
New Paris is part of the National Trail Local School District. The National Trail School District campus is located 4.5mi from New Paris. .

New Paris has a public library, a branch of the Preble County District Library.

Notable people
 Benjamin Hanby, wrote the Christmas carol "Up On The House Top" in New Paris in 1864
 Grayson L. Kirk, president of Columbia University, advisor to the State Department, and instrumental in the formation of the United Nations; was briefly principal of New Paris High School (
 David Purviance, minister and legislator

References

External links
 New Paris Chamber of Commerce

Villages in Preble County, Ohio
Villages in Ohio
Populated places established in 1832
1832 establishments in Ohio